Genealogy was an Armenian supergroup that was formed to represent Armenia in the Eurovision Song Contest 2015. Five of the six members come from a different continent of the Armenian diaspora whose families once spread all over the world after the Armenian genocide of 1915. The five artists from the diaspora also symbolize the five petals of the forget-me-not (official logo of the 100th anniversary of the Armenian genocide, commemorated in April 2015), while the center of the flower is represented by the sixth artist, based in Armenia.

The group performed the song "Face the Shadow" in the contest. The song was originally called "Don't Deny", but organizers changed it later to the present title, as it was deemed too political (hinting at Armenian genocide denial).
The song represented Armenia in the Eurovision Song Contest 2015 on the final held on 23 May 2015, finishing 16th overall, with a total of 34 points from only 8 countries including a maximum 12 points from Georgia.

Members
The first member of the group, Essaï Altounian, a French Armenian, was announced on 16 February 2015. The second member of the group, Tamar Kaprelian, an American-Armenian singer, was announced on 20 February 2015. The third member being Vahe Tilbian, an Armenian-Ethiopian singer, was announced on 23 February 2015. The fourth member was Stephanie Topalian, a U.S. born Armenian-American-Japanese singer residing in Japan. Her father is Armenian-American and her mother Japanese; her membership was announced on 27 February 2015. The fifth member is Mary-Jean O'Doherty Basmadjian, an Australian opera singer of Armenian descent.  Her membership was announced on 3 March 2015. The sixth member is Inga Arshakyan, who also represented Armenia at the Eurovision Song Contest 2009 in Moscow, along with her sister, Anush.

On 28 April 2015 the five Armenian diaspora members of the group, the American Kaprelian, the Australian O'Doherty Basmadjian, the Ethiopian Tilbian, the French Altounian and the Japanese-American Topalian, became Armenian citizens and at the end of an audience with President Serzh Sargsyan were given their Armenian passports by the President. The sixth member Inga Arshakyan already carries Armenian citizenship.

Discography

Singles

After Eurovision
After Eurovision, Tamar Kaprelian from Genealogy released a collective single "The Otherside" featuring a number of other singers who were in the final including Elhaida Dani, Elina Born, Maria-Elena Kyriakou and fellow Genealogy member Stephanie Topalian.  Tamar also competed in Depi Evratesil 2018 with the song "Poison (Ari Ari)", for which she was a favorite to win.  She was eliminated in the semifinal.

Essaï Altounian was a judge in Depi Evratesil 2017, where he mentored Artsvik to victory.  In 2019, he was a member of the "Wall of the World" panel on the CBS talent competition The World's Best.

References

External links

Official website

Eurovision Song Contest entrants for Armenia
Armenian musical groups
Eurovision Song Contest entrants of 2015
Supergroups (music)